Live at the Fillmore East 1968 is a live album by the English rock band The Who. It was recorded at the Fillmore East, New York City on Saturday 6 April 1968 and released on 20 April 2018 as a double album on CD, and a triple album on LP.

Track listing
All songs written by Pete Townshend except where noted.
Disc one
 "Summertime Blues" (Eddie Cochran, Jerry Capehart) - 4:15
 "Fortune Teller" (Naomi Neville) - 2:38
 "Tattoo" - 2:58
 "Little Billy" - 3:38
 "I Can't Explain" - 2:28
 "Happy Jack" - 2:18
 "Relax" - 11:57
 "I'm a Boy" - 3:23
 "A Quick One, While He's Away" - 11:15
 "My Way" (Cochran, Capehart) - 3:16
 "C'mon Everybody" (Cochran, Capehart) - 1:55
 "Shakin' All Over" (Johnny Kidd, Guy Robinson) - 6:55
 "Boris the Spider" (John Entwistle) - 2:34
Disc two
 "My Generation" - 33:05

Personnel

The Who
Roger Daltrey - lead vocals 
Pete Townshend - guitars, backing vocals
John Entwistle - bass guitar, backing vocals
Keith Moon - drums

Additional personnel

Kit Lambert - Recording and producer
Bob Pridden and Richard Whittaker - Restoration and mixing
Jon Astley - Mastering
Richard Evans - Design & art direction
Linda McCartney - Photographs of The Who at the Fillmore East
Andy Neill - Essay

References

2018 live albums
The Who live albums